John Nicholls (3 April 1931 – 1 April 1995), better known as Johnny Nicholls or sometimes Jack Nicholls, was an English footballer who played as a forward. During his professional career he represented West Bromwich Albion, Cardiff City and Exeter City.

Biography 
Nicholls was born in Wolverhampton, Staffordshire. He joined West Bromwich Albion as an amateur in August 1950 and turned professional a year later. He won a winners medal with Albion when they beat Preston North End 3–2 in the 1954 FA Cup Final, also winning two England caps in the same year. In May 1957 he joined Cardiff City for £4000, but moved on to Exeter City just six months later. Nicholls stayed with Exeter until 1959. He died in West Bromwich in 1995.

References

External links
 Englandstats.com profile

1931 births
1995 deaths
Footballers from Wolverhampton
English footballers
England international footballers
England under-23 international footballers
Association football forwards
West Bromwich Albion F.C. players
Cardiff City F.C. players
Exeter City F.C. players
Worcester City F.C. players
Telford United F.C. players
Oswestry Town F.C. players
FA Cup Final players